Kittyhawk Down is a crime novel by Garry Disher published in 2003.

External links
 Kittyhawk Down on Google Books

References

Australian crime novels
2003 Australian novels
Allen & Unwin books